This is a list of radio stations that broadcast on FM frequency 105.6 MHz:

In Bangladesh
 Bangladesh Betar Rangpur (Govt. Radio)

In China 
 CNR The Voice of China in Karamay
 CNR Business Radio in Guiyang, Qujing and Xining

In Germany
 Delta Radio  (Lauenburg, Geesthacht and Schwarzenbek frequencies)

In India
 Gyan Bharti

In the Isle of Man
 3FM (Ramsey frequency)

In Italy
 Radio Antenna Borgetto (Borgetto)

In Lithuania
 Ruskoje Radio Baltija

In the United Kingdom
 Capital North East (Newcastle frequency)
 Capital Yorkshire (Bradford and Sheffield frequencies)
 The Breeze Newbury (Newbury frequency)
 Kiss 105-108 (Cambridge frequency)
 KMFM Maidstone
 Radio St Austell Bay

References

Lists of radio stations by frequency